The 1992 Spengler Cup was held in Davos, Switzerland from December 26 to December 31, 1992.  All matches were played at HC Davos's home arena, Eisstadion Davos. The final was won 6-5 by Team Canada over Färjestads BK.

Teams participating
 Team Canada
 Färjestads BK
 EC Hedos München
 HC CSKA Moscow
 HC Fribourg-Gottéron

Tournament

Round-Robin results

Finals

External links
Spenglercup.ch

1992-93
1992–93 in Swiss ice hockey
1992–93 in Russian ice hockey
1992–93 in Canadian ice hockey
1992–93 in German ice hockey
1992–93 in Swedish ice hockey
December 1992 sports events in Europe